Homalocalyx is a genus of  shrubs in the family Myrtaceae described as a genus in 1857. The entire genus is endemic to Australia.

species

References

 
Myrtaceae genera
Myrtales of Australia
Rosids of Western Australia
Taxa named by Ferdinand von Mueller
Endemic flora of Australia